The 1981–82 Pittsburgh Panthers men's basketball team represented the University of Pittsburgh in the 1981–82 NCAA Division I men's basketball season. Led by head coach Roy Chipman, the Panthers finished with a record of 20–10. They received an automatic bid to the 1982 NCAA Division I men's basketball tournament where they lost in the first round to Pepperdine. This was Pitt's last season in the Eastern 8 Conference. They moved to the Big East Conference next season.

References

Pittsburgh Panthers men's basketball seasons
Pittsburgh
Pittsburgh
Pittsburgh Pan
Pittsburgh Pan